Quilpie Airport  is an airport serving Quilpie, Queensland, Australia. The airport received $242,666 for security upgrades from the Australian Government in 2006.

Facilities

Airlines and destinations

Services are operated under contract to the Government of Queensland and will be taken over by Regional Express Airlines from 1 January 2015.

See also
 List of airports in Queensland

References

External links
 

Airports in Queensland
South West Queensland